The Komodo (Komodo: Ata Modo) are the indigenous ethnic group that inhabit Komodo Island, West Manggarai Regency, East Nusa Tenggara. They call themselves Ata Modo which means Modo people and the Island they inhabit is called Tana Modo. J.A.J. Verheijen (1989) named the inhabitants of the island: Komodo people.

History
In Komodo Island and Rinca Island in East Nusa Tenggara actually not only live komodo dragon, an animal believed to be the real form of a mythical creature called a dragon. On this island also live the Komodo Tribe, the first inhabitants of Rinca Island. Along with the planning of the Komodo National Park area, the Komodo people is threatened with expulsion.

According to legend, komodo dragon is actually a twin of the Komodo people who was born by a woman named Putri Naga (Dragon Princess) who later married a local man. Putri Naga then gave birth to a male and an egg which then incubated a female komodo dragon. The relationship between the Komodo people and the komodo dragon animal was discovered when the children of Putri Naga were hunting. At that time he met a dragon who wanted to eat Deer prey. When he was about to kill him, the Putri Naga appeared who told him that Komodo was his twin brother.

Culture
Besides Komodo dragons, the people of Komodo National Park also have a unique culture. Unfortunately, the culture is gradually being forgotten. The Komodo people is an indigenous ethnic group that lives on Komodo Island and Rinca Island. Some of them are now selling souvenirs, becoming tour guides, or providing homestays. To hold a Komodo cultural performance, they rarely do it.

Language
The Komodo people uses Komodo language and Manggarai language in their daily life and also uses Indonesian language fluently when they are guides.

Trust
The Komodo people is predominantly religious Islam mixed with mysticism such as the myth about Dragon Princess which is believed by the people in Komodo Island and the surrounding islands.

Ceremony
Kolo Kamba is a symbolic dance that tells the life struggle of the ancient ancestors. A leader (Ompu Dato) will erect wood for about a meter. Drum is hit, the boys dance, silat, until he beat the log in a trance like the kuda lumping player in Java Island. The log was beaten because it became a symbol of evil.

Settlement
Komodo Village is located in Labuan Bajo, Flores. Inhabited by the Komodo people, who are believed to be able to talk to komodo, due to the myth of one mother. They were the first group of humans to settle on Rinca Island, only to be followed by Bajau people.

Population
The Komodo people inhabits Komodo Village, West Manggarai Regency. Fishing village is inhabited by about 800 families. Its population stands at 2,000. The majority are fishermen and some are active as Rangers in Komodo National Park. In the 1930s, it was said their number was 143 peoples. However, in the period of 47 years, in 1977 their number became 505 peoples.

See also
Komodo dragon
Komodo Island
Komodo language

References

Ethnic groups in Indonesia